Shades of LA is an American crime drama television series that aired from October 10, 1990 until April 6, 1991.

Premise
While recovering from a gunshot wound, a Los Angeles detective finds that he can see the spirits of the dead trapped in limbo until their missions on Earth are complete.

Cast
 John D'Aquino as Det. Michael Burton
 Warren Berlinger as Lt. Wesley
 Kenneth Mars as Uncle Louis Burton
 David L. Crowley as Jack Monaghan
 Brian Libby as Nick Santini
 Gale Mayron as Annie Brighton

Episodes

References

Citations

Sources

External links
 

1990 American television series debuts
1991 American television series endings
1990s American crime drama television series
English-language television shows
First-run syndicated television programs in the United States
Television shows set in Los Angeles
Television series by Universal Television
Limbo
Television series about ghosts